Sasikala Pushpa (born 27 May 1976) is a Indian politician who serving as vice presidentof the Bharatiya Janata Party in Tamil Nadu. She served as a member of the Parliament in the Rajya Sabha. She was also a mayor of Thoothukudi Municipal Corporation from 2011 to 2014.

Personal life 
In March 2018, Sasikala Pushpa married Dr. B Ramaswamy in violation of the order of the Madurai Family Court to stay the marriage. The stay of the Court was based on a complaint lodged by wife of Ramasamy from their previous marriage, who says she is still married to Ramaswamy, and has not yet officially divorced him. The court has said that the first marriage is still valid. Ramasamy has a daughter from his previous marriage and his previous wife alleged of constant death threats to her family for the last 6 months threatening her to divorce Ramasamy.

Her second husband filed a complaint against her in January 2022 for allegedly letting people inside their home without his knowledge. He claimed that when he entered their home, he was welcomed by an unknown women, he found Packets of food  scattered around our house and scent of alcohol filled the house, Sasikala Pushpa was lying in the bedroom, in another room he allegedly found an unidentified half-dressed man sleeping. He also claimed Sasikala Pushpa allegedly started hurling abuses at him and tried to attack him, apart from threatening to murder him. JJ Nagar police registered a case against Sasikala Pushpa and two others in February 2022, based on her husband's complaint that she is using their house in Anna Nagar for prostitution.

Political career
In August 2016, it was alleged that she had been expelled from the All India Anna Dravida Munnetra Kazhagam (AIADMK) party after an altercation with Dravida Munnetra Kazhagam (DMK) MP Tiruchi Siva at Delhi IGI airport.  In July 2017 the Supreme Court found that no expulsion notice had been served and that she had not, in fact been expelled by the party.

In December 2016, AIADMK cadres thrashed expelled AIADMK MP Sasikala Pushpa's husband Lingeswaran Thilagan and their legal representatives when they arrived at the Royapettah AIADMK office to file nomination for the post of General Secretary.  Pushpa's husband Lingeswara Thilagan was later arrested.

Sasikala Pushpa Ramaswamy joined BJP on February 2, 2020. She Was Appointed as Vice President of Tamil Nadu BJP.

Legal case
A 22 year old maid of Sasikala Pushpa on August 9, 2016, alleged that she and her sister suffered sexual harassment at the hands of Pushpa's husband Lingesvara Thilakan, her son, her mother who allegedly tortured them and also against pushpa of torture. The maid claimed that she was threatened to be killed if she told anybody about the sexual harassment and when she tried to escape from their house in Anna Nagar, they caught her and shaved her head. They claimed that they were fired in 2015 and ordered not to reveal anything that happened to them. The Pudukkottai All Women Police Station, registered a case against Sasikala Pushpa, and her family based on a complaint by the her maids. A temporary relief by the Delhi high court stating that her family members should not be arrested till August 22, was given to her husband and son on August 18. They filed a joint petition before the Madurai bench of the Madras high court seeking anticipatory bail and claimed it was an act of political vendetta. The maids withdrew their complaint in March 2017.

References

1976 births
Living people
All India Anna Dravida Munnetra Kazhagam politicians
Women members of the Rajya Sabha
Rajya Sabha members from Tamil Nadu